Ken Eulo (born November 17, 1939) is a Eugene O'Neill Award-winning writer and bestselling author whose novels have collectively sold over 13 million copies worldwide.

Born in Newark, New Jersey, Eulo was raised in nearby Nutley and graduated in 1957 from Nutley High School. He received his theater training at the Pasadena Playhouse and Heidelberg University.

Career 
Eulo's began his career in New York City, in the 1970s, as a playwright. In the 1980s, he received national recognition with his first horror book series The Brownstone Trilogy.<ref>{{citation|last=D'Ammassa|first=Don|title=Encyclopedia of Fantasy and Horror Fiction: Second Edition|url=https://books.google.com/books?id=-7JbAgAAQBAJ&q=the+brownstone+trilogy+novel+ken+eulo&pg=PP373|year=2013|isbn=9781438140636}}</ref> Since its publication in October 1980, the series has developed a cult following. His success was followed by the novels Nocturnal, The Ghost of Veronica Gray, Manhattan Heat, Claw  and The House of Caine. During the same decade Eulo moved to Los Angeles where he worked as a writer for television shows, including Small Wonder, Marblehead Manor, and Benson''.

Eulo relocated to Orlando, Florida in the 1990s where he founded and has served as the artistic director for the New York Acting Ensemble. The repertory company consists of writers, directors, and actors. They regularly produce touring shows and host regular performances in the Orlando area. Several notable company members have included writer Daniel Corey and actor Creagen Dow

References 

1939 births
Living people
American horror writers
Writers from Newark, New Jersey
Nutley High School alumni
People from Nutley, New Jersey
Heidelberg University alumni
Screenwriters from New Jersey
Eugene O'Neill Award winners
Ghost story writers
Acting teachers